Niederkrüchten is a municipality in the district of Viersen, in North Rhine-Westphalia, Germany. It is situated approximately 15 km east of Roermond and 15 km west of Mönchengladbach.

Elmpt 
The formerly separate settlement of Elmpt was incorporated into Niederkrüchten in 1972. Elmpt was the site of a British armed forces base, known from its construction in 1953 until 2002 as RAF Brüggen and from 2002 until 2015 as Javelin Barracks. In December 2015 the base was handed back to the North Rhine-Westphalian authorities, who use it as accommodation for refugees.

Personalities

Personalities born in Niederkrüchten
 Wilhelm Lindemann (1828–1879), priest in Niederkrüchten, literary historian and deputy of the Prussian Landtag
 Karl Otten (1889–1963), writer and pacifist
 Helmut Loos (1950–), musicologist
 Amilia Heidlberger (1965-), french writer and activist

Personalities associated with Niederkrüchten

 Waldemar Bonsels (1880–1952), writer (for example Maya the Bee)
 Charlotte Roche (born 1978), actor and author

Economy

References

External links

Viersen (district)